Najas filifolia, the needleleaf waternymph, is an aquatic plant in the Hydrocharitaceae. It is a rare and little-known species, known from only three counties (Decatur County, Georgia; Santa Rosa County, Florida; and Leon County, Florida. It is unusual in the genus in bearing fruits that are recurved to crescent-shaped.

References

filifolia
Aquatic plants
Flora of Florida
Flora of Georgia (U.S. state)
Plants described in 1985